Santa Maria Annunziata is the main religious building (duomo) of the town of Salò, Italy.

History
The construction of the church, dedicated to the Annunciation of the Virgin Mary, was begun in 1453 by the architect Filippo delle Vacche of Caravaggio, Lombardy. It is built in the Late Gothic style to replace the previous edifice that stood at the site. Its façade remains unfinished.

Important works
The church preserves within it paintings by Romanino, Moretto da Brescia, Zenone Veronese and Paolo Veneziano. There is a grand polyptych of gilded wood dating from 1510. There are frescoes executed by Antonio Vassilacchi dating from 1602.

Conserved paintings
 The Madonna and Saints Bonaventura and Sebastiano, c. 1517, oil on board, by Romanino.
 Anthony of Padua and a donor, 1529, oil on canvas, by Romanino.
 Lamentation over the dead Christ, and Apostles, between 1484 (Verona) and 1554 (Salò), oil on panel, Zenone Veronese.

Entry portal
The main entrance into the church is through the great portal executed between 1506 and 1508 by Gasparo Cairano and Antonio Mangiacavalli, who were among the chief exponents of Renaissance sculpture in Brescia.

See also

References

External links

Churches in the province of Brescia
15th-century Roman Catholic church buildings in Italy